Fenggang County is a county in the north of Guizhou province, China. It is under the administration of Zunyi city.

Geography

Administrative Divisions
Fengguang County consists of thirteen towns and one township:

Longquan Town, or Lungchuan Lungchüan
Jinhua Town
Yachuan Town
Fengyan Town
Yonghe Town
Huaping Town
Suiyang Town
Tuxi Town
Heba Town
Tianqiao Town
Wangzhai Town
Shijing Township
Xinjian Township

Climate

References

External links
Official link of Fenggang County government

 
County-level divisions of Guizhou
Zunyi